Žovnek Castle is a castle northeast of Braslovče, Slovenia. It lies above Lake Žovnek. The Lords of Žovnek, later Counts of Celje, were named after the castle. The castle was first mentioned in 1278 as Castrum Sevnekke, and later as Sannegg.

External links

Castles in Styria (Slovenia)